is a Japanese football manager and former player who played as a defender. He is currently the head coach of the Japan women's national football team.

Playing career
Ikeda was born in Koganei on October 4, 1970. After graduating from Aoyama Gakuin University, he joined the Urawa Reds in 1993. He played many matches as a left side back during the first season. However his did not play as much in 1995 and he retired at the end of the 1996 season.

Coaching career
After retirement, Ikeda started his coaching career with the Urawa Reds in 1997. He mainly coached the youth team (1997-2001) and the top team (2002-2008). In 2012, he moved to Avispa Fukuoka and served as coach for the top team until 2016. In October 2012, manager Koji Maeda was dismissed and Ikeda managed as caretaker until the end of the season. In 2017, he became a manager for Japan women's U-20 national team. He led Japan to win the championship at the 2017 AFC U-19 Championship and qualified for the 2018 U-20 World Cup. In 2018, U-20 Japan won the championship at the U-20 World Cup. In November, he became the manager for the Japan women's U-17 national team for the 2018 FIFA U-17 Women's World Cup as Naoki Kusunose's successor.

Club statistics

References

External links

1970 births
Living people
Aoyama Gakuin University alumni
Association football people from Tokyo Metropolis
People from Koganei, Tokyo
Japanese footballers
J1 League players
Urawa Red Diamonds players
Japanese football managers
Avispa Fukuoka managers
Association football defenders
Japan women's national football team managers